The Queen Anne style of British architecture refers to either the English Baroque architecture of the time of Queen Anne (who reigned from 1702 to 1714) or the British Queen Anne Revival form that became popular during the last quarter of the 19th century and the early decades of the 20th century. In other English-speaking parts of the world, New World Queen Anne Revival architecture embodies entirely different styles.

Overview
With respect to British architecture, the term is mostly used for domestic buildings up to the size of a manor house, and usually designed elegantly but simply by local builders or architects, rather than the grand palaces of noble magnates.  The term is not often used for churches.  Contrary to the American usage of the term, it is characterised by strongly bilateral symmetry, with an Italianate or Palladian-derived pediment on the front formal elevation.

Colours were made to contrast with the use of carefully chosen red brick for the walls, with details in a lighter stone that is often rather richly carved. Christopher Wren used this technique, which achieved a rich effect for a considerably lower cost than using stone as a facing throughout, in his rebuilding of Hampton Court Palace, commissioned by William and Mary.  Here it harmonized well with the remaining Tudor parts of the palace.  This highly visible example probably influenced many others.

The architectural historian Marcus Binney, writing in The Times in 2006, describes Poulton House in Poulton, Wiltshire (built in 1706, during the reign of Queen Anne) as "...Queen Anne at its most delightful". Binney lists what he describes as the typical features of the Queen Anne style:
 a sweep of steps leading to a carved stone door-case
 rows of painted sash windows in boxes set flush with the brickwork
 stone quoins emphasizing corners
 a central triangular pediment set against a hipped roof with dormers
 typically box-like "double pile" plans, two rooms deep

When used of revived "Queen Anne style" of the 19th and 20th centuries, the historic reference in the name should not be taken at all literally, as buildings said to be in the "Queen Anne style" in other parts of the English-speaking world normally bear even less resemblance to English buildings of the early 18th century than those of any style of revival architecture to the original. In particular, Queen Anne style architecture in the United States is a wholly different style, as is that in Australia, and normally includes no elements very typical of the actual architecture of Queen Anne's reign, the names having been devised for marketing purposes.

British Queen Anne Revival

George Devey (1820–1886) and the better-known Norman Shaw (1831–1912) popularized the Queen Anne style of British architecture of the industrial age in the 1870s. Norman Shaw published a book of architectural sketches as early as 1858, and his evocative pen-and-ink drawings began to appear in trade journals and artistic magazines in the 1870s. (American commercial builders quickly adopted the style.)

Shaw's eclectic designs often included Tudor elements, and this "Old English" style also became popular in the United States, where it became known (inaccurately) as the Queen Anne style. Confusion between buildings constructed during the reign of Queen Anne and the "Queen Anne" style still persists, especially in England.

British Victorian Queen Anne architecture empathises more closely with the Arts and Crafts movement than does its American counterpart. A good example is Severalls Hospital in Colchester, Essex (1913–1997), now defunct.

The historic precedents of the architectural style were broad and several:
 fine brickwork, often in a warmer, softer finish than the Victorians characteristically used, varied with terracotta panels, or tile-hung upper storeys, with crisply-painted white woodwork, or blond limestone detailing
 oriel windows, often stacked one above another
 corner towers
 asymmetrical fronts and picturesque massing
 Flemish mannerist sunken panels of strapwork
 deeply shadowed entrances
 broad porches
 overall, a domesticated free Renaissance style

In the 20th century, Edwin Lutyens and others used an elegant version of the style, usually with red-brick walls contrasting with pale stone details.

New World Queen Anne Revival

United States

In the United States, "Queen Anne" is used to describe a wide range of picturesque buildings with "free Renaissance" (non-Gothic Revival architecture) details and as an alternative both to the French-derived Second Empire and the less "domestic" Beaux-Arts architecture, is broadly applied to architecture, furniture, and decorative arts of the period 1880 to 1910; some "Queen Anne" architectural elements, such as the wraparound front porch, continued to be found into the 1920s.

The gabled and domestically scaled style arrived in New York City with the new housing for the New York House and School of Industry Sidney V. Stratton, architect, 1878. Distinctive features of American Queen Anne architecture may include an asymmetrical façade; dominant front-facing gable, often cantilevered out beyond the plane of the wall below; overhanging eaves; round, square, or polygonal tower(s); shaped and Dutch gables; a porch covering part or all of the front facade, including the primary entrance area; a second-story porch or balconies; pedimented porches; differing wall textures, such as patterned wood shingles shaped into varying designs, including resembling fish scales, terra cotta tiles, relief panels, or wooden shingles over brickwork, etc.; dentils; classical columns; spindle work; oriel and bay windows; horizontal bands of leaded windows; monumental chimneys; painted balustrades; and wooden or slate roofs. Front gardens often had wooden fences.

Australia

In Australia the influence of Richard Norman Shaw contributed to the development of the Federation style, of which the heyday lasted from 1890 to 1915, and which is subdivided into twelve phases, Federation Queen Anne being one and the most popular style for houses built between 1890 and 1910. The style often utilised Tudor-style woodwork and elaborate fretwork that replaced the Victorian taste for wrought iron. Verandahs were usually a feature, as were the image of the rising sun and Australian wildlife; plus circular windows, turrets and towers with conical or pyramid-shaped roofs.

The first Queen Anne house in Australia was Caerleon in the suburb of Bellevue Hill, New South Wales. Caerleon was designed initially by a Sydney architect, Harry Kent, but was then substantially reworked in London by Maurice Adams. This led to some controversy over who deserved the credit. The house was built in 1885 and was the precursor for the Federation Queen Anne house that was to become so popular. The APA Building in the Melbourne city centre was an example of the Queen Anne style being used for non-residential purposes, though at some stage the building may have been apartments. It was demolished in 1981 after the modernism boom in Melbourne took off–factors that sealed its demolition included rapacious development, lax heritage attitudes in Australian cities, and the owner's own decision to argue for a demolition permit which was granted.

Caerleon was followed soon after by West Maling, in the suburb of Penshurst, New South Wales, and Annesbury, in the suburb of Ashfield, New South Wales, both built circa 1888. These houses, although built around the same time, had distinct styles, West Maling displaying a robust Tudor influence that was not present in Annesbury. The style soon became increasingly popular, appealing predominantly to reasonably well-off people with an "Establishment" leaning.

The style as it developed in Australia was highly eclectic, blending Queen Anne elements with various Australian influences. Old English characteristics like ribbed chimneys and gabled roofs were combined with Australian aspects like encircling verandahs, designed to keep the sun out. One outstanding example of this eclectic approach is Urrbrae House, in the Adelaide suburb of Urrbrae, South Australia, part of the Waite Institute. Another variation with connections to the Federation Queen Anne style was the Federation Bungalow, featuring extended verandahs. This style generally incorporated familiar Queen Anne elements, but usually in simplified form.

Some prominent examples are:
 West Maling, corner of Penshurst Avenue and King Georges Road, Penshurst, Sydney
 Homes, Appian Way, Burwood, Sydney
 Homes, Haberfield, New South Wales
 Caerleon, 15 Ginahgulla Road, Bellevue Hill, Sydney (sold for $22 million in January 2008)
 Annesbury, 78 Alt Street, Ashfield, Sydney
 Weld Club, Barrack Street, Perth
 ANZ Bank, Queens Parade, Fitzroy North, Melbourne
 Campion College, Studley Park Road, Kew, Melbourne
 Redcourt Estate, Armadale, Melbourne
 Tay Creggan, Hawthorn, Melbourne

Gallery

See also
 Queen Anne style furniture
 Revivalism (architecture)
 Stuart architecture
 Ramsbury Manor, Wiltshire
 Restoration style
 The Vyne, Hampshire

References

Further reading 
 Girouard, Mark, Sweetness and Light: The Queen Anne Movement, 1860–1900, Yale University Press, 1984. The primary survey of the movement.
 Macquoid, Percy, Age of Walnut, 1904.
 The Shingle Style and the Stick Style: Architectural Theory and Design from Downing to the Origins of Wright, revised edition, Yale University Press, 1971.
 Rifkind, Carole.  A Field Guide to American Architecture. Penguin Books, New York, 1980.
 Whiffen, Marcus.  American Architecture Since 1780. MIT Press, Cambridge, Massachusetts, 1999.

External links

 Photography of Queen Anne Style Homes in Hamilton, Ontario
 [Federation Queen Anne Style
 Gothic Queen Anne Style

 
01
Victorian architectural styles
British architectural styles
House styles
18th-century architecture
19th-century architectural styles